Mehdi Fennouche (born 20 February 1993) is an Algerian professional footballer who plays as a winger.

Career
He made his professional debut for Toulouse on September 20, 2013, against Saint-Étienne, replacing Wissam Ben Yedder in the 82nd minute. Fennouche represented Algeria at the under-20 level, participating in the 2012 UNAF U-20 Tournament. He signed for AFC Tubize on 1 September 2014.

In January 2017, Fennouche signed for Bulgarian First League club Lokomotiv Gorna Oryahovitsa. He left the club at the end of the season following the relegation to Second League and joined fellow top flight club Vereya in July 2017, after a successful trial period.

On 8 January 2018, Fennouche signed with Cherno More, another Bulgarian club.  On 17 February, he made his debut in a 1–4 home defeat by Beroe.

References

External links
 
  
 

1993 births
Living people
Footballers from Paris
Algerian footballers
Algerian expatriates in Belgium
Algerian expatriates in France
Algerian expatriates in Bulgaria
Expatriate footballers in Belgium
Expatriate footballers in France
Expatriate footballers in Bulgaria
Algeria youth international footballers
Ligue 1 players
Toulouse FC players
Challenger Pro League players
A.F.C. Tubize players
First Professional Football League (Bulgaria) players
FC Lokomotiv Gorna Oryahovitsa players
FC Vereya players
PFC Cherno More Varna players
Association football wingers
21st-century Algerian people